Ever since 1952, the Social Democrats had held the mayor's position. Since at least the 1981 election they had also won an absolute majority to the council. 

In the 2017 election they had won 16 seats, and this made it easy for Jesper Würtzen to continue for a third full term. . 

In this election, the Social Democrats would have it's worst election result since 1981. However they were still extremely strong in the Municipality, and won 13 seats with 50.8% of the vote. Therefore Jesper Würtzen looked set to continue as mayor. This would eventually be confirmed.

Electoral system
For elections to Danish municipalities, a number varying from 9 to 31 are chosen to be elected to the municipal council. The seats are then allocated using the D'Hondt method and a closed list proportional representation.
Ballerup Municipality had 19 seats in 2021

Unlike in Danish General Elections, in elections to municipal councils, electoral alliances are allowed.

Electoral alliances  

Electoral Alliance 1

Electoral Alliance 2

Electoral Alliance 3

Results

Notes

References 

Ballerup